is a Japanese adult visual novel by Minori released on July 23, 2004. A PlayStation 2 port, was released on April 6, 2006, and a fandisc, was released on March 31, 2006. The deluxe Step of Spring Paku Paku Pack comes with puppets of the three main heroines (Yuzuki, Yū, and Nagomi). Also, the Paku Paku Pack box is exceptionally big (about twice the size of the PlayStation 2's). The opening movie was done by Makoto Shinkai. The game is set in a small town in the fictional , Japan, to which the protagonist returns after his experiences in Tokyo.

Main characters

Media

Fandisc
The fandisc Sakura no Sakukoro -Haru no Ashioto Pleasurable Box- was released on March 31, 2006. The fandisc featured an after story, short stories set in the timeline of the original game and other additional content. It also featured an original video animation titled Haru no Ashioto the Movie: Ourin Dakkan. The OVA featured an original story where the sub-heroine Kusunoki-sensei takes the school and the main characters must confront her.

References

External links
 Official Haru no Ashioto website 
 Official Haru no Ashioto -Step of Spring- website 
 Official Sakura no Saku Koro website 
 

2004 video games
Bishōjo games
Eroge
Japan-exclusive video games
PlayStation 2 games
Video games developed in Japan
Visual novels
Windows games
Alchemist (company) games
HuneX games
Minori (company) games